Dara Singh (1928–2012) was an Indian wrestler, actor and politician.

Dara Singh may also refer to:

 Dara Singh (Bajrang Dal) (born 1962), Hindu activist convicted for murders of Christian missionary Graham Staines and his two sons
 Dara Singh Chauhan (born 1963), Indian politician